Bjorn Asbrandsson (960 - after 1030) was an Icelandic Viking. He appears in the Sagas of Icelanders, in particular the Eyrbyggja saga. According to Irish tradition, Asbrandsson was a farmer, warrior, exile Jomsviking and settler in North America.

Sources
 Die Saga von den Leuten auf Eyr.(Eyrbyggja saga). Hrsg. und aus dem Altisländischen übersetzt von Klaus Böldl. München: Eugen Diederichs Verlag 1999. 
 Bernhard Gottschling: Die Vinland Sagas. Aus dem Altisländischen übersetzt. Altnordische Bibliothek, Bd. 2, Hattingen: Verlag Bernd Kretschmer 1982.
 Paul Herrmann: 7 vorbei und 8 verweht. Das Abenteuer der frühen Entdeckungen. Hamburg: Hoffmann und Campe 1978, Teil VI.: Amerika - Das Hvitramannaland - Das Land der Bleichgesichter, darin Näheres zu Björn Asbrandsson und Gudleif Gudlaugson, S. 195–254.
 Lutz Mohr: Ein isländischer Jomswikinger in Pommern, Schweden und der Neuen Welt. In: Autorenkollektiv, Maritimes von der Waterkant. Peenemünde: Axel Dietrich Verlag 1994, S. 5–12. 
 Lutz Mohr: Die Jomswikinger, Mythos oder Wahrheit. Nordische Sagas zusammengestellt, kommentiert u. hrsg. Elmenhorst: Edition Pommern 2009. 
 Lutz Mohr: Drachenschiffe in der Pommernbucht. Die Jomswikinger, ihrer Jomsburg und der Gau Jom. Hrsg. von Robert Rosentreter. (edition rostock maritim). Rostock: Ingo Koch Verlag 2013. 
 Felix Niedner: Die Geschichte vom Goden Snorri (Eyrbyggja saga). Thule. Erste Reihe, Bd. 7. Hrsg. und übertr. von Felix Niedner. Jena: Eugen Diederichs Verlag 1920.
 Grönländer und Färinger Geschichten. Thule. Band 13. Hrsg. und übertr. von Felix Niedner. Neuausg. mit Nachw. von Siegfried Beyschlag. Düsseldorf-Köln: Eugen Diederichs Verlag 1965.

10th-century Icelandic people
11th-century Icelandic people
Jomsvikings
Norse colonization of North America
Viking warriors
960 births
11th-century Vikings